William Wallace Stickney (March 21, 1853December 15, 1932) was an American lawyer and politician. As a Republican, he served as the 48th governor of Vermont from October 4, 1900, to October 3, 1902.

Biography
Stickney was born in Plymouth, Vermont on March 2, 1853, a son of John Winslow Stickney and Ann Pinney Stickney. He graduated from Black River Academy in Ludlow, Vermont in 1873 and Phillips Exeter Academy in 1877. He went on to study law in the office of William H. Walker, was admitted to the bar in 1878 and practiced in Ludlow as the partner of John G. Sargent. Among the prospective attorneys who studied under Stickney and Sargent were Julius A. Willcox, who later served as an associate justice of the Vermont Supreme Court, and Joseph F. Radigan, who later served as Vermont's United States Attorney.  Stickney married Elizabeth Lincoln on May 4, 1881. After her death on March 29, 1903, he married Sarah Effie Moore in Sarasota, Florida, on June 1, 1905.

Career

Stickney was president of the Ludlow Savings Bank and Trust Company. He was clerk of the Vermont House of Representatives from 1882 to 1892 and was state's attorney for Windsor County from 1882 to 1884 and again from 1890 to 1892. He was elected in 1892 to represent Ludlow in the Vermont House of Representatives, and served until 1896; he was selected to serve as Speaker of the House in his first term, and held the post during his entire House tenure.

Elected to the office of Governor of Vermont in 1900, he served from October 4, 1900 to October 3, 1902. Sargent served as Stickney's Secretary of Civil and Military Affairs (chief assistant). A cousin of the Calvin Coolidge family, Stickney appointed Coolidge's father John Coolidge to his military staff with the rank of colonel. As governor, he favored abolishing the office of Tax Commissioner. During his administration, legislation was passed establishing the boundary line between Massachusetts and Vermont. After serving one term, he returned to his law practice and banking and insurance interests. He received the honorary degree of LL.D. from Norwich University in 1902.

As a delegate to the 1924 Republican National Convention, he seconded Calvin Coolidge's nomination for president.

In 1926 Stickney was also an unsuccessful candidate for the Republican U.S. Senate nomination. Stickney's Ludlow home is now a bed and breakfast called "The Governor's Inn."

Death

Stickney died in Sarasota, Florida, and was interred at Pleasant View Cemetery in Ludlow, Vermont.

References

External links

National Governors Association
The Political Graveyard
Encyclopedia, Vermont Biography
The Governors Inn.com

1853 births
1932 deaths
Republican Party governors of Vermont
Speakers of the Vermont House of Representatives
Republican Party members of the Vermont House of Representatives
Vermont lawyers
State's attorneys in Vermont
People from Ludlow (town), Vermont
Phillips Exeter Academy alumni
Norwich University alumni
Burials in Vermont